Kristin Ørmen Johnsen (born 8 March 1953) is a Norwegian politician for the Conservative Party. She was elected to the Parliament of Norway from Buskerud in 2013 where she is member of the Standing Committee on Health and Care Services.

References 

Conservative Party (Norway) politicians
Members of the Storting
Buskerud politicians
1953 births
Living people
21st-century Norwegian politicians